Jesper Mathisen (born 17 March 1987) is a former Norwegian football player. Originally a striker, he converted to being a defender. He has been on the first team since 2004, but only in the 2008 season has he been getting significant playing time He did better for youth specific national teams, and in 2005 scored four goals against Malta on the U-18 team.

Jesper Mathisen is the son of footballer Svein "Matta" Mathisen, who is often referred to as a legendary Start player.

Career statistics

References

External links

Club bio
Current season info from Verdens Gang

1987 births
Living people
Sportspeople from Kristiansand
Norwegian footballers
IK Start players
Bryne FK players
Norwegian First Division players
Eliteserien players
Association football defenders
Norway youth international footballers
Norway under-21 international footballers